Edward C. Bosbyshell, known as E.C. Bosbyshell, (1822–1894) was a politician in Iowa and California, where he was a member of the Los Angeles Common Council, the governing body of that city. He was also a merchant and a banker.

Background
Bosbyshell was born in Philadelphia, Pennsylvania, in 1822 and spent some of his early adult life in Calhoun County, Illinois, "where, in an overflow of the rivers, he lost his entire property." He made a "new start" in Glenwood, Iowa, as a merchant. He was also on the school board there and was a county judge, as well as mayor.

He came to Los Angeles in 1884 and was one of the founders of the Southern California Bank. He was a member of the First Congregational Church of Los Angeles.

Bosbyshell was a two-term member of the Los Angeles Common Council, representing the 3rd Ward, beginning on December 12, 1887, and ending on February 21, 1889. In 1893 he was a member of the Board of Police Commissioners.

He and his wife celebrated their 50th wedding anniversary in 1894. They had a son, Edward P. Bosbyshell.

Death and interment
Bosbyshell died in Los Angeles County on December 20, 1894, and was buried at the Angeles Rosedale Cemetery in Los Angeles, California.

References

American merchants
Businesspeople from Iowa
Businesspeople from Los Angeles
School board members in Iowa
Mayors of places in Iowa
Iowa state court judges
Los Angeles Common Council (1850–1889) members
19th-century American politicians
1822 births
1894 deaths
Politicians from Philadelphia
People from Calhoun County, Illinois
People from Glenwood, Iowa
19th-century American businesspeople
19th-century American judges